Reuben Solomon is an Australian-British political consultant and digital media strategist. He served as a Special Adviser (SpAd) to former Prime Minister Liz Truss.  

Solomon is considered a protégé of Boris Johnson's favourite election strategist, Sir Lynton Crosby.

Career 
Reuben Solomon spent four years at Sir Lynton Crosby’s research, campaigning and intelligence firm C|T Group, where he specialised in digital strategy and digital campaigns, under the mentorship of Sir Lynton. In 2019 The Guardian published articles reporting that Reuben Solomon was behind a series of hugely influential Facebook advertising campaigns advocating for a No-deal Brexit.

Solomon served as Head of Digital to the British Conservative Party, playing an instrumental role in the party’s successful campaign in the 2019 United Kingdom general election, led by Isaac Levido.

In January 2022, Solomon was appointed as a Special Adviser (SpAd) to Liz Truss, who was serving as Secretary of State for Foreign, Commonwealth and Development Affairs, after obtaining permission from 10 Downing Street to hire a digital media specialist – “Instagram guru”. He played a role in promoting the United Kingdom’s values and influence through foreign policy on digital platforms. Coined the “social media wizard”, he was credited with keeping Liz Truss’s profile as slick as her competitors’ during her tenure as Foreign Secretary. 

During the July–September 2022 Conservative Party leadership election, Solomon led Liz Truss’s digital campaign as Head of Digital. The digital campaign focused on delivering consistent messaging to Conservative Party members through a targeted digital strategy, which was a crucial element in her appointment as Prime Minister of the United Kingdom.

In October 2022, Solomon was appointed as a Special Adviser (SpAd) to the Prime Minister and Head of Digital in 10 Downing Street, overseeing the Prime Minister’s online profile and running UK government digital campaigns from 10 Downing Street.

See also 

 Sir Lynton Crosby
 Isaac Levido

References

External links 
 Reuben Solomon on Twitter

British political consultants
British special advisers
Australian political consultants
1988 births
Living people